A Beautiful Exchange is the nineteenth album in the live praise and worship series of contemporary worship by Hillsong Church. 
 It was recorded at the Sydney Entertainment Centre and Hillsong Church in Australia by Reuben Morgan, Darlene Zschech, Joel Houston and the Hillsong Worship Team. The album was released in the United States on 29 June 2010 in partnership with EMI.

These worship songs explore themes including sacrifice and redemption ("Beautiful Exchange"), love ("Our God Is Love") and hope ("Forever Reign"), which is also the first radio single. Hillsong Live albums are led by worship leaders including Reuben Morgan, Joel Houston, Ben Fielding and Darlene Zschech. Other key songs include: "Open My Eyes" (sung by Reuben Morgan), "The One Who Saves" (sung by Ben Fielding) and "Greatness Of Our God" (sung by Darlene Zschech). Many of the songs were written by Reuben Morgan with other authors such as Jason Ingram, Stu Garrard, Ben Fielding and Darlene Zschech.

On 9 July 2010 the album debuted at No. 1 on the US Billboard Christian Albums Chart and at No. 40 on the US Billboard 200 chart. During the initial week on the charts it remained in the top 3. And this was also the last official album to feature Brooke Fraser as a worship leader until her return to Hillsong Worship six years later (with the release of the band's 2016 live album "Let There Be Light")

Track listing (CD)

Track listing (DVD/Blu-Ray)
 "You"
 "Open My Eyes"
 "Forever Reign"
 "The One Who Saves"
 "Like Incense / Sometimes by Step"
 "The Greatness of Our God"
 "The Father's Heart"
 "Our God Is Love"
 "Love Like Fire"
 "Believe"
 "Thank You"
 "Beautiful Exchange"

Bonus features
"Documentary: A Beautiful Exchange – Behind the Screens"

Hillsong London
 "The Answer" (Reuben Morgan and Braden Lang) Worship leader: Peter Wilson 
 "God Our Salvation" (Jay Cook and Dave Tymoszuk) Worship leader: Jay Cook
 "For All You Are / You Are Good" (David Kennedy / Dave George) Worship leader: Ingrid Boe-Kennedy, Jay Cook / Juliet Adekambi 
 "All Things New" (Dave George and Tim Steer) Worship leader: Dave George
 "Glorious One / To Bring You Glory" (Reuben Morgan and Jay Cook / Dave Tymoszuk) Worship leader: Jay Cook

Reception
Ryan Barbee of Jesus Freak Hideout said the highlight of the album is Brooke Fraser's "Like Incense/Sometimes By Step" and called it "one of the most intimate tracks Hillsong has put out to date". He also wrote: A Beautiful Exchange has some very powerful moments and some weak ones. However, we as listeners are outsiders looking in. You might not find everything you're looking for in [it] but you'll definitely find a heart of worship." Kim Jones of About.com called the album "beautiful, warm and intimate" and concluded, "A Beautiful Exchange will suck you in and deliver you to the feet of your Savior - and your day will be all the better for it."

Awards

The album was nominated for two Dove Awards: Praise & Worship Album of the Year and Long Form Music Video of the Year, at the 42nd GMA Dove Awards.

Personnel

Worship leaders:
Darlene Zschech – senior worship leader, senior lead vocal, songwriter
Reuben Morgan – worship pastor, worship leader, frontline singer, songwriter, producer
Joel Houston – creative director, worship leader, frontline singer, songwriter, producer
Brooke Fraser – worship leader, frontline singer, songwriter
Jad Gillies – worship leader, frontline singer
Annie Garratt – worship leader, frontline singer
Matt Crocker – worship leader, songwriter
Ben Fielding – worship leader, frontline singer, songwriter
Jorim Kelly - worship leader
Peter Wilson  - worship leader (bonus feature only)
Jay Cook  - worship leader (bonus feature only)
Dave George  - worship leader (bonus feature only)
Ingrid Boe-Kennedy  - worship leader (bonus feature only)
Juliet Adekambi  - worship leader (bonus feature only)

Frontline singers:
Jonathon Douglass 
Jill McCloghry
Mia Fieldes
Braden Lang
David Ware
Laura Toganivalu
Marcus Temu
David Hodgson
Sheila Gallegos
Andy Barrow
Terrence Ryan
Tristan Perdriau
Joanna Norden
Jessie Malcolm
Michelle Grigg
Collena Gillespie
Sherrod Dine
Niki Carless
Billy Conway

Music directors: 
Autumn Hardman
Nigel Hendroff

Drums:  
Brandon Gillies, Simon Kobler, Rolf Wam Fjell

Bass:  
Adam Crosariol, Ntando "Bob" Mpofu, Matt Tennikoff, Ben Whincop

Electric guitars: 
Ben Fielding, Nigel Hendroff, Timon Klein, Isaac Soon, Dylan Thomas, Jorim Kelly and Reuben Morgan

Acoustic guitars:  
Matt Crocker, Ben Fielding, Jad Gillies, Nigel Hendroff, Joel Houston, Brooke Ligertwood, Reuben Morgan, Peter Wilson

Keyboards:
David Andrew, Autumn Hardman, Peter James, Dave George

Violins:  
Hanna Crezee, Lauren Hodges

Cello:  
Jared Dahl

Trombone:  
Marc Warry

French Horn: 
Elizabeth Gorringe

Trumpet:  
Tim Whincop

String arrangements on "Believe" by:
Vanessa JamesChoir:  
Hillsong Church ChoirSenior Pastors:Brian and Bobbie HoustonWorship Pastor:Reuben MorganAlbum Cover'''
'The X Concept' Cover Artwork Depicts: Reuben Morgan & Darlene Zschech

Instruments 

 Nigel Hendroff: Duesenberg guitars 
 Ben Fielding: Duesenberg guitars and Collings guitars 
 Timon Klein: Gretsch guitars 
 Dylan Thomas: Fender guitars 
 Jorim Kelly: Gretsch guitars
 Isaac Soon: Gibson guitars 
 Reuben Morgan: Rickenbacker guitars and Martin guitars 
 Joel Houston: Martin guitars 
 Jad Gillies: Gibson guitars 
 Brooke (Fraser) Ligertwood: Taylor guitars 
 Matt Crocker: Martin guitars 
 Ntando "Bob" Mpofu: Lakland basses

Charts

Year-end charts

References

2010 live albums
2010 video albums
Live video albums
Hillsong Music live albums
Hillsong Music video albums